Plumas Lake is a master-planned exurb and census-designated place in Yuba County, California. At full build-out the community is expected to have roughly 12,000 homes and 36,000 residents. It lies at an elevation of 46 feet (14 m). The population was 8,126 at the 2020 census.

Plumas Lake shares the same ZIP code as Olivehurst, California, a neighboring town. However, Plumas Lake stands as a separate community that is located south of the crossing of McGowan and Arboga and includes the North Arboga Study Area.

Many individuals and agencies (including the U.S. Army Corps of Engineers) were opposed to the construction of this project due to the history of severe (15+ feet of standing water) flooding. Notable floods in the area occurred in 1986 and 1997. The flood risk in the area was exacerbated by hydraulic mining which occurred in the Yuba River watershed upstream of the region. Mine tailings wound up in the river beds and were then transported into the Sacramento Valley, where they accumulated in the river channels and reduced their conveyance capacities. This mining activity was part of the Gold Rush of California.

A park and ride facility was opened on October 1, 2009 by Caltrans in the Plumas Lake area, along California State Route 70 and Feather River Blvd. There are currently four gas stations and a pharmacy in Plumas Lake.

Geography
According to the United States Census Bureau, the CDP covers an area of 8.4 square miles (21.7 km), all of it land.

Demographics

The 2010 United States Census reported that Plumas Lake had a population of 5,853. The racial makeup of Plumas Lake was 3,923 (67.0%) White, 372 (6.4%) African American, 73 (1.2%) Native American, 474 (8.1%) Asian, 44 (0.8%) Pacific Islander, 451 (7.7%) from other races, and 516 (8.8%) from two or more races. Hispanic or Latino of any race were 1,312 persons (22.4%).

The Census reported that 5,853 people (100% of the population) lived in households, 0 (0%) lived in non-institutionalized group quarters, and 0 (0%) were institutionalized.

There were 1,745 households, out of which 1,043 (59.8%) had children under the age of 18 living in them, 1,195 (68.5%) were opposite-sex married couples living together, 155 (8.9%) had a female householder with no husband present, 117 (6.7%) had a male householder with no wife present.  There were 127 (7.3%) unmarried opposite-sex partnerships, and 20 (1.1%) same-sex married couples or partnerships. 183 households (10.5%) were made up of individuals, and 21 (1.2%) had someone living alone who was 65 years of age or older. The average household size was 3.35.  There were 1,467 families (84.1% of all households); the average family size was 3.61.

The population was spread out, with 2,144 people (36.6%) under the age of 18, 380 people (6.5%) aged 18 to 24, 2,204 people (37.7%) aged 25 to 44, 926 people (15.8%) aged 45 to 64, and 199 people (3.4%) who were 65 years of age or older.  The median age was 29.1 years. For every 100 females, there were 104.6 males.  For every 100 females age 18 and over, there were 99.0 males.

The homeowner vacancy rate was 6.2%; the rental vacancy rate was 6.0%.  4,835 people (82.6% of the population) lived in owner-occupied housing units and 1,018 people (17.4%) lived in rental housing units.

Education and community services
The southern part of Plumas Lake is served by the Plumas Elementary School District (K-8) and the Wheatland Union High School District (9-12).  The northern part of the community is served by the Marysville Joint Unified School District (K-12).

Plumas Lake receives fire services from the Linda Fire Protection District and water, wastewater, and parks & recreation services from the Olivehurst Public Utility District.

Government

References

External links
Plumas Lake School District
Plumas Lake Youth Sports
 Plumas Lake Live Weather and Scanner Feed

Census-designated places in Yuba County, California
Census-designated places in California